Amir Ali Sadollah (born August 27, 1980) is a retired American mixed martial artist, formerly with the Ultimate Fighting Championship. He was the winner of Spike TV's The Ultimate Fighter 7. He has fought exclusively within the confines of the UFC Octagon since the beginning of his MMA career, making him one of the few fighters who have done so.

Mixed martial arts career

Early career 
Sadollah was born in Brooklyn, New York but raised in Richmond, Virginia to an Iranian father and an Irish-American mother. Following his graduation from John Randolph Tucker High School he attended J. Sargeant Reynolds Community College. Amir began mixed martial arts as a way to stay in shape. He began to take the sport more seriously after working as a surgical technologist at VCU Healthsystems and seeing similarities in the personalities of surgeons and fighters.

Amir trained at Combat Sports Center in Richmond, VA.  Amir trained under Brian Crenshaw, Fred Corritone and alongside Dwayne "Diesel" Shelton.  Dwayne helped fine tune Amir's skills and put together his highlight reel for the application for "The Ultimate Fighter 7".

While at Combat Sports Center Amir attained an undefeated 4-0 (MMA), 3-0 (Muay Thai) amateur record through Combat Sports Center and its sister promotion, Combat Sports Challenge prior to going on to the Ultimate Fighter Reality television show, first making it into the "house" and then going on to defeat four opponents to win Season 7 and a three-fight UFC contract, which, due to his outstanding performance, has been extended. Other notable professional fighters from Combat Sports Center that trained with Amir include Dwayne "Diesel" Shelton, Anthony Morrison, WEC veteran and 145 pound Ring of Combat Champion, and international Kickboxing star Francois "Bang Bang" Ambang, who came to CSC from Cameroon to join the fight team.

Sadollah's amateur record of 4–0 included a decision win, a knockout and two submissions. Sadollah was one of the 32 successful candidates out of 250 applicants at the October 2007, International Fight League draft in Chicago. He impressed Dana White and producers enough to earn a trip to Las Vegas, Nevada to compete on The Ultimate Fighter. Amir went on to win the tournament and the title of the Ultimate Fighter. He is currently a member of Throwdown Training Center together with friend and coach Forrest Griffin.

He holds a purple belt in Brazilian Jiu-Jitsu under Cameron Diffley .

The Ultimate Fighter 
Sadollah came on to the show with no professional record in MMA, and went on to win the competition. Sadollah defeated Steve Byrnes by tapout due to an armbar to win the elimination bout and get into the house.

Sadollah was the second pick for Team Forrest and fourth overall. His first preliminary fight was against Team Rampage's Gerald Harris. Sadollah defeated Harris via TKO due to strikes. Sadollah's quarter-final match was against fellow Team Forrest member and friend, Matt Brown. After a close back and forth fight, Sadollah eventually defeated Brown via tapout due to a triangle choke.

Sadollah's semi-final match was against Team Rampage's number one pick, CB Dollaway. After being put on his back for almost the whole fight, Sadollah locked up an armbar in the last minute of the last round to be the winner by submission. He was then set to face fellow Team Forrest member, Jesse Taylor at the finale to crown the winner of the tournament. However, due to Taylor's antics after taping the show, he was kicked out of the tournament and replaced by Dollaway, who had fought Tim Credeur for the spot.

Ultimate Fighting Championship 
On the season finale of TUF 7, Amir earned another victory over CB Dollaway with an armbar only this time it was in the first round. The victory secured his title of The Ultimate Fighter and provided him with a six-figure UFC contract.

Sadollah's second UFC fight was scheduled to be against Nick Catone at UFC 91. However, due to a leg infection, Sadollah withdrew from the match. A replacement for Sadollah could not be found so the match was scrubbed from the card.  The match was rescheduled for February 7, 2009 at UFC Fight Night 17. On January 23, Sadollah was again forced to withdraw from the fight, this time due to a broken clavicle.

Sadollah made his post-Ultimate Fighter Debut at UFC 101 on August 8, 2009 in Philadelphia (at the Wachovia Center) against Johny Hendricks. In the opening seconds of the first round, Hendricks blocked a high head kick from Sadollah and countered with an uppercut knocking Sadollah to his knees. Hendricks continued to land punches until referee Dan Miragliotta pulled him off and ended the fight 29 seconds into the first round. Some have criticized Miragliotta for stopping the fight too early, as Sadollah seemed to be trying to get up, but Miragliotta defended his stoppage saying Sadollah was "out of it" and "still looked glassy eyed and asked me what happened."

Sadollah defeated newly re-signed welterweight Phil Baroni at UFC 106. During the fight Sadollah showed a superior Muay Thai clinch and precision kicks.

Sadollah defeated Brad Blackburn on January 11, 2010, at UFC Fight Night 20 via unanimous decision.  During the bout Sadollah utilized great head and body kicks along with knees in the clinch and a solid ground game.

Sadollah faced Korean judoka, Dong Hyun Kim, at UFC 114. Kim took down Sadollah in all three rounds, dominating Sadollah with superior Judo and Wrestling. Kim won the fight by unanimous decision with all three judges scoring it 30–27 for Kim.

Sadollah then faced Peter Sobotta at UFC 122. Amir would win the fight via unanimous decision. Sadollah once again demonstrated his impressive Muay Thai to earn the decision win.

Sadollah was expected to face Duane Ludwig on March 26, 2011 at UFC Fight Night 24. However, Ludwig was injured and was briefly replaced by TUF 9 winner, James Wilks.  Wilks was then forced out as well and replaced by DaMarques Johnson. After a back and forth first round, Sadollah was more aggressive and forced Johnson to exchange against the cage early in the second round having success with a flurry of a strikes. Sadollah would then earn a takedown and go on to gain dominant position, unleashing a steady stream of ground and pound until gaining gift wrap control, proceeding to punish Johnson with elbows from his free arm, forcing a tap due to strikes.

Sadollah lost to Duane Ludwig via unanimous decision (29–28, 29–28, 29–28) on August 14, 2011 at UFC on Versus 5.

Sadollah was expected to face Jorge Lopez on February 4, 2012 at UFC 143.  However, Sadollah was forced out of the bout with an injury and replaced by Matt Riddle.

Sadollah/Lopez eventually took place on May 15, 2012 at UFC on Fuel TV: Korean Zombie vs. Poirier. Sadollah won the bout via split decision.

Sadollah lost via unanimous decision (29-28, 29-28, 30-27) to Dan Hardy on September 29, 2012 at UFC on Fuel TV 5.

Sadollah was expected to face Stephen Thompson on May 25, 2013 at UFC 160.  However, Sadollah pulled out of the bout citing an injury and was replaced by Nah-Shon Burrell.

After being sidelined for nearly two years recovering from a litany of injuries, Sadollah was briefly linked to a bout with Nico Musoke on October 4, 2014 at UFC Fight Night 53.  However, Sadollah was pulled from the pairing with Musoke in favor of a bout with Yoshihiro Akiyama on September 20, 2014 at UFC Fight Night 52. He lost the fight via unanimous decision and was subsequently released from the promotion. After Sadollah's release, UFC President Dana White was quoted as saying, "Amir had one of the best runs in the history of The Ultimate Fighter, but I don't think he really wanted to be a fighter. You can't stay on the roster by fighting once every 2 years. At this point, he was just taking up a roster spot. We wish Amir the best of luck."

Championships and achievements

Mixed martial arts 
Ultimate Fighting Championship
Ultimate Fighter 7 Winner
He holds the UFC record for most leg kicks landed in three five-minute rounds (49 leg kicks, vs. Peter Sobotta)

Kickboxing 
World Kickboxing Association
WKA Amateur US Muay Thai Championship

Mixed martial arts record

|-
|Loss
|align=center|6–5
|Yoshihiro Akiyama
|Decision (unanimous)
|UFC Fight Night: Hunt vs. Nelson
|
|align=center|3
|align=center|5:00
|Saitama, Japan
|
|-
|Loss
|align=center|6–4
|Dan Hardy
|Decision (unanimous) 
|UFC on Fuel TV: Struve vs. Miocic
|
|align=center|3
|align=center|5:00
|Nottingham, England
|
|-
|Win
|align=center|6–3
|Jorge Lopez
|Decision (split)
|UFC on Fuel TV: Korean Zombie vs. Poirier
|
|align=center|3
|align=center|5:00
|Fairfax, Virginia, United States
|
|-
|Loss
|align=center|5–3
|Duane Ludwig
|Decision (unanimous)
|UFC Live: Hardy vs. Lytle
|
|align=center|3
|align=center|5:00
|Milwaukee, Wisconsin, United States
|
|-
|Win
|align=center|5–2
|DaMarques Johnson
| TKO (submission to elbows)
|UFC Fight Night: Nogueira vs. Davis
|
|align=center|2
|align=center|3:27
|Seattle, Washington, United States
|
|-
|Win
|align=center|4–2
|Peter Sobotta
|Decision (unanimous)
|UFC 122
|
|align=center|3
|align=center|5:00
|Oberhausen, Germany
|
|-
|Loss
|align=center|3–2
|Dong Hyun Kim
|Decision (unanimous)
|UFC 114
|
|align=center|3
|align=center|5:00
|Las Vegas, Nevada, United States
|
|-
|Win
|align=center|3–1
|Brad Blackburn
|Decision (unanimous)
|UFC Fight Night: Maynard vs. Diaz
|
|align=center|3
|align=center|5:00
|Fairfax, Virginia, United States
|
|-
|Win
|align=center|2–1
|Phil Baroni
|Decision (unanimous)
|UFC 106
|
|align=center|3
|align=center|5:00
|Las Vegas, Nevada, United States
|
|-
|Loss
|align=center|1–1
|Johny Hendricks
|TKO (punches)
|UFC 101
|
|align=center|1
|align=center|0:29
|Philadelphia, Pennsylvania, United States
| Welterweight Debut
|-
|Win
|align=center|1–0
|C.B. Dollaway
|Submission (armbar)
|The Ultimate Fighter: Team Rampage vs Team Forrest Finale
|
|align=center|1
|align=center|3:02
|Las Vegas, Nevada, United States
| Won The Ultimate Fighter 7
|-

Mixed martial arts exhibition record

|-
| Win
| align=center|4–0
| C.B. Dollaway
| Submission (armbar)
| The Ultimate Fighter: Team Rampage vs Team Forrest
| 
| align=center|3
| align=center|2:52
| Las Vegas, Nevada, United States
| 
|-
| Win
| align=center|3–0
| Matt Brown
| Submission (triangle choke)
| The Ultimate Fighter: Team Rampage vs Team Forrest
| 
| align=center|2
| align=center|4:09
| Las Vegas, Nevada, United States
| 
|-
| Win
| align=center|2–0
| Gerald Harris
| TKO (punches)
| The Ultimate Fighter: Team Rampage vs Team Forrest
| 
| align=center|2
| align=center|2:36
| Las Vegas, Nevada, United States
| 
|-
| Win
| align=center|1–0
| Steve Byrnes
| Submission (armbar)
| The Ultimate Fighter: Team Rampage vs Team Forrest
| 
| align=center|2
| align=center|2:38
| Las Vegas, Nevada, United States
| 
|-

See also
 List of male mixed martial artists

References

External links 

 
 
Official UFC Profile

1980 births
American male kickboxers
American male mixed martial artists
American Muay Thai practitioners
American people of Iranian descent
American people of Irish descent
American practitioners of Brazilian jiu-jitsu
American sambo practitioners
Kickboxers from Virginia
Iranian male mixed martial artists
Living people
Middleweight mixed martial artists
Mixed martial artists from Virginia
Mixed martial artists utilizing sambo
Mixed martial artists utilizing Muay Thai
Mixed martial artists utilizing Brazilian jiu-jitsu
Sportspeople from Brooklyn
Sportspeople from Richmond, Virginia
The Ultimate Fighter winners
Welterweight mixed martial artists
Sportspeople of Iranian descent
Ultimate Fighting Championship male fighters